Events in the year 1963 in Nigeria.

Incumbents 
 Monarch:
 Until 1 October: Queen Elizabeth II
 starting 1 October: position abolished
 Governor-General:
 until 1 October: Nnamdi Azikiwe
 starting 1 October: position abolished
 President:
 until 1 October: position not in existence
 starting 1 October: Nnamdi Azikiwe
 Prime Minister: Abubakar Tafawa Balewa
 Senate President: Dennis Osadebay (until 1 October); Nwafor Orizu (starting 1 October)
 House Speaker: Ibrahim Jalo Waziri
 Chief Justice: Adetokunbo Ademola

Politics
October 1, 1963 - Nigeria became a Republic
October 1, 1963 Nnamdi Azikiwe became the first president of Nigeria

Births
January 21 - Hakeem Olajuwon, basketball player

References

 
1960s in Nigeria